Apotomops boliviana is a species of moth of the family Tortricidae that is endemic to Bolivia.

The ground colour of the forewings is white, overscaled and faintly mottled with grey distally. The costal portion of the basal half of forewings is blackish brown. The hindwings are white, but pale beige in the apical region.

Etymology
The species name refers the country of Bolivia, where the species is found.

References

External links

Moths described in 2003
Endemic fauna of Bolivia
Euliini
Moths of South America
Taxa named by Józef Razowski